Biskupice is a municipality and village in Zlín District in the Zlín Region of the Czech Republic. It has about 700 inhabitants.

Notable people
Milan Máčala (born 1943), football manager

References

Villages in Zlín District